Pas Langar is a village in Saghder Rural District, Jebalbarez District, Jiroft County, Kerman Province, Iran. At the 2006 census, its population was 44, in 13 families.

References 

Populated places in Jiroft County